Morris Isaac "Moose" Charlap (December 19, 1928 – July 8, 1974) was an American Broadway composer best known for Peter Pan (1954), for which Carolyn Leigh wrote the lyrics. The idea for the show came from Jerome Robbins, who planned to have a few songs by Charlap and Leigh. It evolved into a full musical, with additional songs by Jule Styne and Betty Comden and Adolph Green. The original run of Peter Pan on Broadway starred Mary Martin as Peter Pan and Cyril Ritchard as Captain Hook.

Career
Charlap was also the composer for the 1969 television movie musical Hans Brinker, which had lyrics by Alvin Cooperman and starred Eleanor Parker (her singing voice was her own), Richard Basehart, John Gregson, Robin Askwith, Roberta Tovey, Sheila Whitmill, and Cyril Ritchard. It was based on the novel by Mary Mapes Dodge. Charlap also wrote the song "First Impression" with lyrics by Carolyn Leigh. The song was dropped from the original 1954 production of Peter Pan but was recorded by Eydie Gorme in 1956. Other songs Charlap wrote that were not included in musicals include "English Muffins and Irish Stew," "Mademoiselle," "Great Day in the Morning," "My Favorite Song," and "Young Ideas."  Ella Fitzgerald recorded his "My Favorite Song" for Decca Records with an orchestra directed by Leroy Kirkland.  Charlap was also a recording artist and had a single, "Good Old Fashioned Lovin'/It Was My Father's Habit," released on ABC 9674 in 1956.

Family
Born Morris Isaac Charlip to a Jewish family in Philadelphia, he married singer Sandy Stewart, whose biggest hit was "My Coloring Book" in 1962. Jazz pianist Bill Charlap is their son. They also had a daughter, Katherine. He and his first wife, Elizabeth, were the parents of a daughter, Anne, and son, Tom, a bass player.

Charlap, who lived with his wife and children on Manhattan's East Side, died at Lenox Hill Hospital in 1974 at the age of 45.

Work on Broadway
Peter Pan (1954, revivals in 1979, 1990, 1991, 1998, 1999) – musical – composer
Whoop-Up (1958) – musical – composer
The Conquering Hero (1961) – musical – composer
Kelly (1965) – musical – composer
Jerome Robbins' Broadway (1989) – revue – featured songwriter for "Peter Pan"
 Clown Around (1972)

Work on Television
Through the Looking Glass (1966 musical) – musical – composer

References

External links

American musical theatre composers
1928 births
1974 deaths
Central High School (Philadelphia) alumni
Musicians from Philadelphia
Jewish American composers
Jewish American songwriters
Songwriters from Pennsylvania
20th-century American composers
20th-century American Jews